"Il sole esiste per tutti" is a song by singer Tiziano Ferro. It is the 4th single from the album Alla mia età, released on 11 September 2009.

Spanish version 

The song was translated into Spanish with the title "El sol existe para todos", which appeared in the Spanish version of the Alla mia età album.

Music video 

The music video's footage was taken from two of Ferro's concerts held in Rome at the Stadio Olimpico on 24 and 25 June 2009.

In the video, Ferro is seen strolling through the corridors of the 'Stadio Olimpico' with his headphones on and then goes towards the stage to start the show.
Ferro is then seen performing the song in front of thousands of fans.

Track listing 

Download digitale
 "Il sole esiste per tutti"
 "El sol existe para todos"

Charts

Notes 

2009 singles
Tiziano Ferro songs
Songs written by Tiziano Ferro
Pop ballads
Contemporary R&B ballads
2009 songs
EMI Records singles
Song recordings produced by Michele Canova